Pracha Prasobdee is a Thai politician. As of 2012 he was a Deputy Minister of the Interior and a member of the House of Representatives of the Pheu Thai Party.

Life
Pracha was born on 31 October 1960, the son of Pranom and Somsamai Prasobdee, with 3 siblings. He obtained a bachelor's degree in law from Siam University, and a master's degree in public law from Dhurakij Pundit University and education administration from Chulalongkorn University. He graduated with a doctoral degree in public administration from Ubon Ratchathani University.

He is married to Nuntawan Prasobdee and has one child. His younger sister, Naruemon Tharndamrong (THAI: นฤมล ธารดำรงค์), was named one of 26 red-shirt political officers while serving as advisor to the Labor Minister.

Politics
Pracha was an unsuccessful candidate for the Palang Dharma Party several times. He was elected as an MP for the first time in 2001 for the Thai Rak Thai Party. He was shot and injured by a hitman in May 2011, before the 2011 general election, but won the election. In 2012, he was appointed as deputy interior minister in Yingluck cabinet.

Awards from the king of Thailand
  Knight Commander (Second Class) Order of the White Elephant
  Knight Grand Cross (First Class) Order of the Crown of Thailand
  Knight Grand Cross (First Class) Order of the White Elephant
  Knight Grand Cordon (Special Class) Order of the Crown of Thailand
  Knight Grand Cordon (Special Class)Order of the White Elephant

References

Pracha Prasobdee
Living people
1960 births
Pracha Prasobdee